The 2022 Southeastern Conference baseball tournament was held from May 24 through 29 at Hoover Metropolitan Stadium in Hoover, Alabama as the conclusion of the 2022 Southeastern Conference baseball season. The annual tournament determined the tournament champion of the Division I Southeastern Conference in college baseball. The Tennessee Volunteers earned the conference's automatic bid to the 2022 NCAA Division I baseball tournament.

The tournament has been held every year since 1977 (with the exception of 2020), with LSU claiming twelve championships, the most of any school.  Original members Georgia and Kentucky along with 2013 addition Missouri have never won the tournament.  This is the twenty-third consecutive year and twenty-fifth overall that the event has scheduled to be held at Hoover Metropolitan Stadium, known from 2007 through 2012 as Regions Park.

Format
The regular season division winners claim the top two seeds and the next ten teams by conference winning percentage, regardless of division, claim the remaining berths in the tournament.  The bottom eight teams play a single-elimination opening round, followed by a double-elimination format until the semifinals, when the format  reverts to single elimination through the championship game. This is the ninth year of this format.

Standings

Bracket

Schedule

Conference championship

References

Tournament
Southeastern Conference Baseball Tournament
SEC baseball tournament
Baseball competitions in Hoover, Alabama
College sports tournaments in Alabama